Clare Public Schools is a public school district headquartered at 201 East State Street in Clare, Michigan, United States. It contains a Primary, Middle, and High School.

Bond Issue 
In 2022, it was proposed that the current Middle School building be torn down, due to poor and out of date infrastructure, and a new school be built in its place, which would become the new High School, and the current High School would be renovated and become the new Middle School. On May 3, 2023, there will be a vote held to see if the proposal passes.

Demographics
2020-2021 School year

Clare Public Schools is 93% White, <1% Black, <1% Asian, 3% Hispanic or Latino.
 Currently 43% percent of the school's population receives free or reduced lunch.
 51% males and 49% females
Teacher to Student ratio: 19:1

Schools

Controversy
In September 2019, Clare Public School was criticized for hosting speaker Tina Griffin to the student body. Tina Griffin spoke of pro-Christian values. Some students took to social media saying "she’s a homophobe that makes false claims constantly and pushed Christianity on us via calling our music and movies satanic and responsible for suicide and murder.” and "She should not have been welcomed here at Clare. This is a huge step down from where we have been and I hope this isn’t where we continue to go."

Shortly after the assembly in Clare, Harrison Schools cancelled the assembly.

In the 2016, after the hiring of current superintendent, Jim Walter, and Alternative high School principal Georgette Kelley, Teacher Julie Mayra was fired after being targeted by the principle for being lesbian. Kelley, who was a devout Pentecostal Christian was open about her opposition to homosexuals. Mayra sued the school in 2019.

In 2021, Principal Steven Newkirk resigned or was fired after an alleged relationship with a teacher. It is not fully known if these allegations are true, however, he was replaced by Thomas Pashak, who is the current Principal.

Notable alumni
 Gloria Sickal Gaither—composer of Christian music; member of the Bill Gaither Trio
 Debbie Stabenow—United States Senator from Michigan since 2001.

References

Schools in Clare County, Michigan
School districts established in 1903
School districts in Michigan
1903 establishments in Michigan